Miller is a suburb of Sydney in the state of New South Wales, Australia 38 kilometres south-west of the Sydney central business district, in the local government area of the City of Liverpool. Neighbouring suburbs include Hoxton Park, Hinchinbrook, Cartwright, Prestons, Sadleir and Busby.

Commercial area
Miller Central is the main shopping centre in Miller that is currently managed by Savills. It contains a Woolworths, Aldi, and approximately 32 other shops. Miller Shopping Centre was sold to new owners in early 2011 and renovations were completed to improve the suburb's appeal.

History
Miller was part of the Green Valley housing estate which was developed between 1961 and 1965. It is named after Peter Miller, an early landholder in the Green Valley area. When in construction, the top soil was trucked over to the north of sydney, leaving clay exposed.

Schools
 Miller Technology High School (contains an English-language program for immigrant children from the entire Liverpool council area)
 Miller Public School
 Miller College
 St Therese Catholic Primary School (Also considered to be in Sadlier)

Population
At the 2016 census, the suburb of Miller recorded a population of 3,237 people. The median age of people in Miller was 36 years, compared to the national median of 38 years. Children aged under 15 years made up 21.7% of the population and people aged 65 years and over made up 13% of the population. Aboriginal and Torres Strait Islander people made up 3.9% of the population. Just over half (55.9%) of people were born in Australia, compared to the national average of 66.7%; the next most common countries of birth were Lebanon (5.6%), Vietnam (5.0%), Fiji (2.5%), Iraq (1.7%) and New Zealand (1.7%). Just under half (45.5%) of the population spoke only English at home; the next most common languages were Arabic (18.6%), Vietnamese (8.1%), Hindi (2.2%), Samoan (1.9%) and Spanish (1.8%). The most common responses for religion were Catholic 22.5% and Islam 20.6%.

The median household income was $739 per week, just under half the national median of $1,438 per week. The average household size was 2.7 people.

References

Suburbs of Sydney
City of Liverpool (New South Wales)